Jervis  is a stop on the Luas light-rail tram system in Dublin, Ireland.  It opened in 2004 as a stop on the Red Line.  The Red Line runs east to west along Abbey Street through the city centre, and the Jervis stop is located to the east of Jervis Street, in front of the Jervis Shopping Centre.  It also provides access to the Temple Bar and St. Mary's Abbey.  It has two edge platforms integrated into the pavement.  The platforms are staggered - a rarity for Luas stops - to prevent congestion.  The stop connects with a number of Dublin Bus routes.

Incidents
On 7 April 2014, a car collided with a Luas tram at the junction of Jervis Street and Abbey Street, which caused the car to fatally strike a 35-year-old pedestrian from Dublin, who was pronounced dead at the scene.

References

Luas Red Line stops in Dublin (city)